Malua Bay (postcode: 2536) is a locality in the South Coast region of the state of New South Wales, Australia. It is situated in the Eurobodalla Shire.

Malua Bay town centre is located astride George Bass Drive, which is approximately 13 kilometres drive from the town of Batemans Bay. The town boundaries extend to Dunns Creek Road in the West, Ridge Road to the North, and almost to Broulee Road in the South, where it abuts the town of Rosedale. Malua Bay is approximately  South of Sydney, and  East of Canberra via the Kings Highway.

Malua Bay has a range of beaches and bays on its border with the Tasman Sea, including; Malua Bay Beach, Mosquito Bay, Garden Bay, and McKenzies Beach. Recreational fishing is popular from the rocks at many of these beaches. Surfing is the predominant activity at McKenzies Beach and there is a public-access boat launching ramp at Mosquito Bay.

Facilities
Malua Bay website
Batemans Bay Surf Life Saving Club
Malua Bay Bowling & Recreation Club

Transport
Bus timetables

References

Towns in New South Wales
Towns in the South Coast (New South Wales)
Bays of New South Wales
Eurobodalla Shire
Coastal towns in New South Wales